The Charge of the Heavy Brigade at Balaclava may refer to:

An event during the Battle of Balaclava
The Charge of the Heavy Brigade at Balaclava (poem) by Lord Alfred Tennyson
Charge of the Heavy Brigade (painting), work by Godfrey Douglas Giles
The Charge of the Heavy Brigade at Balaklava by William Simpson (artist)